Sarah Pirozek is a New York-based British film producer, director, and writer. She has directed television commercials, a documentary feature, has produced and directed feature films, and developed TV series. Her most recent project is #LIKE a Noir Thriller starring Marc Menchaca.

Reel News Daily: The writing is fantastic. The complexity of this screenplay will blow any expectations you have out of the water. The scenes with her closest friends allow them to discuss toxic masculinity in an approachable way. You will not see the twists coming. #Like is shocking and brilliant. You’ll walk away slightly traumatized. People will be talking about this film for a long time.

In 1998 she directed her first major documentary, titled Free Tibet, which documents the Tibetan Freedom Concert held in order to raise awareness for the hostile conditions that Tibetan citizens endure due to China's reign over the country.

Biography 
Pirozek studied filmmaking at Saint Martin's School of Art in London before moving to New York City to attend the independent study program at the Whitney Museum of American Art.

Filmography

References

External links 
 Official Sarah Pirozek website
 

Year of birth missing (living people)
Living people
British women film directors
Alumni of Saint Martin's School of Art